Central Valley may refer to:

 Chilean Central Valley, Chile
 Central Valley (Chilean wine region), Chile
 Costa Rican Central Valley, Costa Rica
 Central Lowlands, Scotland, sometimes known as the Central Valley
 Central Valley (California), United States
 Central Valley, New York, United States
 Central Valley, Utah, United States

See also
 Central Valley Greenway
 Central Valley High School (disambiguation)